WKJB (710 AM, "Radio Isla 710") is a radio station licensed to serve Mayagüez, Puerto Rico.  The station is owned by Radio Station WKJB AM-FM, Inc. It airs a News/Talk format.

The station was assigned the WKJB call letters by the Federal Communications Commission.

References

External links
WKJB official website

KJB
Radio stations established in 1946
KJB
1946 establishments in Puerto Rico